Michael Rodríguez may refer to:

 Michael Rodríguez (footballer) (born 1981), Costa Rican footballer
 Michael Rodríguez (cyclist) (born 1989), Colombian road racing cyclist
 Michael Rodriguez (acrobatic gymnast) (born 1982)
Michael Anthony Rodriguez (1962–2008), member of the Texas Seven
Michael Rodriguez (politician), member of Chicago City Council

See also
 Michael Rodrigues (disambiguation)